Leontin Toader (born 20 May 1964) is a retired Romanian football goalkeeper.

Honours
Rapid București
Divizia B: 1989–90
Cupa României runner-up: 1994–95
Jiul Petroșani
Divizia B: 1995–96

Notes

References

1964 births
Living people
People from Urziceni
Romanian footballers
Liga I players
Liga II players
AFC Unirea Slobozia players
FC Rapid București players
CSM Jiul Petroșani players
AFC Rocar București players
Association football goalkeepers
Romanian expatriate sportspeople in Saudi Arabia
Romanian expatriate sportspeople in the United Arab Emirates
Romanian expatriate sportspeople in Qatar
Romanian expatriate sportspeople in Kuwait
Romanian expatriate sportspeople in Cyprus